Rear Admiral Lâm Ngươn Tánh (18 October 1928, in Sadec, Cochinchina – 11 February 2018) was the last Chief of Naval Operations of the Republic of Vietnam Navy during the Vietnam War.

Biography
In 1974, he took part in the Battle of Hoang Sa between China and South Vietnam.

Lâm Ngươn Tánh gained asylum in the United States after the Fall of Saigon in April 1975 and worked as a naval architect at the Naval Surface Warfare Center, Dahlgren, Virginia. A devout Anti-Communist, he continued to work with Vietnamese exile groups.

Highlights of naval career 
 Saigon Merchant Marine Academy, 1948
 The Republic of Vietnam Naval Academy, 1952
 United States Naval Postgraduate School in Monterey, California, 1958
 United States Naval Shipyard Management School in Pearl Harbor, 1960
 United States Naval War College in Newport, Rhode Island, 1965
 United States National Defense Management College in Monterey, California, 1973
 Commander of RVN Navy Eastern Riverine Forces Command. 1954
 Commander of RVN Navy Sea Forces Command and Fleet Command, 1955
 RVN Navy Chief of Staff (two terms) 1963 and 1965
 Commander of RVN Naval Shore Establishments and Schools Command, 1959
 Commandant of the Saigon Naval Shipyard, 1960
 Deputy to the Deputy Chief of General Joint Chief of Staff for Navy Operations, 1965
 Commandant and Founder of the RVN Armed Forces Political Warfare College, 1965
 Vice-Chief of Naval Operations, 1970
 Chief of Naval Operations, 1975 (for over 3 months)
 His honors include the National Order of Vietnam, fourth Degree of the Republic of Vietnam.

Activities in exile 
In April 1975, Lam and his wife left Vietnam after the Fall of Saigon. They eventually settled in King George, Virginia. Lam served the U.S. Defense Department (Department of Navy) for more than 20 years as a naval architect  at the Naval Surface Warfare Center in Dahlgren, Virginia.

From 1981 to 1985, he was Secretary General of the Republic of Vietnam Veterans Association. From 1989 to 1991, he founded the Vietnamese Navy General Association and was the first-term Chairman. Since 1997, he has served as the Minister for Foreign Affairs of an exiled anti-communist organization The Government of Free Vietnam. In 2000, he became the Deputy Prime Minister in charge of National Defense. In August 1997, he founded the Free Vietnam Coalition Party and serves on the Member Central Leadership Council. He is the founder of Vietnamese Navy General Association and First Term Chairman. In 2005, he was elected as Prime Minister of The Government of Free Vietnam.

References

 The Paracel Islands (Hoang-Sa) Sea Battle
 Government of Free Vietnam Official Site
 Inauguration Ceremony of The Government of Free Vietnam (Photos)

1928 births
2018 deaths
Republic of Vietnam Navy
Naval War College alumni
Generals of South Vietnam
Vietnamese emigrants to the United States
Vietnamese anti-communists
South Vietnamese military personnel of the Vietnam War
Vietnamese admirals
People from Đồng Tháp Province

4 Lam, Nguon Tanh
Naval Postgraduate School alumni